Rijkevorsel is a municipality located in the Belgian province of Antwerp. In 2021, Rijkevorsel had a total population of 12,262. The total area is 46.79 km².

History
Rijkevorsel, Vaishak, Voirssele, Forsela in 1194. Recent archaeological finds at the Willow Street attest to human presence in the late stone age, the bronze and Iron Age and the Roman times. A large cemetery with cremation (urnfield) on the Helhoekheide may point to a first settlement being present here already before the beginning of our era.

Notable inhabitants
Aster Berkhof, writer
Leo Pleysier, writer
George Kooymans, composer, musician, producer, guitarist at Golden Earring rockband
Toon Aerts, Belgian cyclist born in Malle and currently lives in Rijkevorsel. 2016 European champion.

References

External links

Official website - Available only in Dutch

Municipalities of Antwerp Province
Populated places in Antwerp Province